Usera is a station on Line 6 of the Madrid Metro. It is located in Zone A.

References 

Line 6 (Madrid Metro) stations
Railway stations in Spain opened in 1981
Buildings and structures in Usera District, Madrid